"Sweet September" is a song written by Bill McGuffie, Phyllis L. Kasha, and Stanley Mills.  The song was first released as a single by Artie Butler in 1963.

Other versions 
Pete Jolly (for his 1963 album Pete Jolly Trio and Friends), 
Freda Payne (for her 1964 album After the Lights Go Down Low and Much More!!!).  Payne's version was also released as a single on the Impulse Records label, but it failed to garner much success.
The Lettermen (for their 1966 album More Hit Sounds of The Lettermen), In 1965, this version was a hit on the Easy Listening chart when released as a single, peaking at #24.
Howard Roberts (for his 1966 album Whatever's Fair!) 
Joe Pass (for his 1965 album A Sign of the Times)
Sylvia Syms.

References

The Lettermen songs
1965 singles
1962 songs